The Wisconsin spring nonpartisan general election was held April 1, 2008.  Voters statewide cast ballots for Wisconsin Supreme Court and an amendment to the state Constitution.

The Wisconsin fall partisan primary was held on September 9, 2008.  Voters selected the parties' candidates for the subsequent fall general election.

The Wisconsin fall partisan general election was held on November 4, 2008, the same date as the Federal and Congressional elections.  Offices elected include half of the state's Senate seats and all of the state's Assembly seats.

Spring nonpartisan election

Judge Michael Gableman was elected with 51% of the vote, defeating incumbent Justice Louis Butler with 49% of the vote.  The heavy spending of outside interest groups in this race, including Wisconsin Manufacturers and Commerce, has inspired some to call for reforms to Wisconsin election law and the selection of judges.  The ascendancy of Michael Gabelman to the bench tilts the Court in a more conservative direction.

By a margin greater than 2-1, voters chose to amend the state's Constitution.

Partial veto. Shall section 10(1)(c) of article V of the constitution be amended to prohibit the governor, in exercising his or her partial veto authority, from creating a new sentence by combining parts of two or more sentences of the enrolled bill?

The amendment is intended to reduce the veto power of the Governor which has been historically used by governors of all parties to rework legislation.

Fall partisan election

Voters in Wisconsin in this election cycle cast ballots for many state legislators. Senators from even-numbered districts and all assemblymen were up for election.

Senate contests

Senate Democrats expanded the controlling majority they gained from the Republicans in the previous election cycle.

Candidates listed in bold are their party's nominee for the seat.  Candidates with a strike have not submitted adequate nomination documents to appear on the 2008 primary and general election ballots by the July 8th deadline.  Candidates not submitting adequate nomination documents may still run write-in candidacies.

† This race is yet subject to a recount. * Results are AP election night reports not yet certified by the elections board.

Assembly contests

Assembly Republicans failed to defend their control of the house with Democrats taking the majority in the chamber for the first time in 14 years.

Candidates in bold won their primary and are their party's nominee for the indicated seat.  Candidates with a strike have not submitted adequate nomination documents to appear on the 2008 primary and general election ballots by the July 8th deadline.  Candidates not submitting adequate nomination documents may still run write-in candidacies.

† This race is yet subject to a recount. * Results are AP election night reports not yet certified by the elections board.

External links
 Wisconsin Government Accountability Board Registered Candidates
Project Vote Smart - Wisconsin
Wisconsin Senate districts map
Wisconsin Assembly districts map
Search Wisconsin candidate Statements of Economic Interest

References

 
Wisconsin
Wisconsin State Legislature elections